John Bainbrigge Story  (29 July 1812 – 7 January 1872) was an English first-class cricketer and British Army officer.

The son of John Bainbrigge Story senior, he was born in July 1812 at Woodborough, Nottinghamshire. He was educated at Eton College, before going up to Corpus Christi College, Oxford. After graduating from Oxford, Story enlisted in the Leicestershire Yeomanry as a cornet in January 1832, with promotion to the rank of lieutenant in September 1835. He served as the High Sheriff of Leicestershire in 1842. Story made his debut in first-class cricket for the Gentlemen of the North against the Gentlemen of the South in 1858, making a total of four appearances in the fixture to 1861. Besides his brief first-class career, Story had a long association with Derbyshire prior to the formation of Derbyshire County Cricket Club. He ended his military career with the Leicestershire Yeomanry as a major, in addition to serving as a justice of the peace. He died at his home at Lockington Hall in January 1872 and was survived by his wife, whom he had married in 1833. His nephew, William Story, also played first-class cricket.

References

External links

1812 births
1872 deaths
People from Woodborough, Nottinghamshire
Cricketers from Nottinghamshire
People educated at Eton College
Alumni of Corpus Christi College, Oxford
Leicestershire Yeomanry officers
High Sheriffs of Leicestershire
English cricketers
Gentlemen of the North cricketers
English justices of the peace
Military personnel from Nottinghamshire